Salvador Martínez Pérez (26 February 1933 – 2 January 2019) was a Mexican Roman Catholic bishop.

Biography 
Martínez Pérez was born in Mexico and was ordained to the priesthood in 1960. He served as bishop of the Roman Catholic Diocese of Huejutla, Mexico, from 1994 to 2009.

Notes

1933 births
2019 deaths
21st-century Roman Catholic bishops in Mexico
20th-century Roman Catholic bishops in Mexico